Jalalabad  Assembly constituency is  one of the 403 constituencies of the Uttar Pradesh Legislative Assembly,  India. It is a part of the Shahjahanpur district and one of the five assembly constituencies in the Shahjahanpur Lok Sabha constituency. First election in this assembly constituency was held in 1952 after the "DPACO (1951)" (delimitation order) was passed in 1951. After the "Delimitation of Parliamentary and Assembly Constituencies Order" was passed in 2008, the constituency was assigned identification number 132.

Wards/Areas 
Extent  of Jalalabad Assembly constituency is KCs Jalalabad, Allhaganj, Kalan,  Mirzapur, Jalalabad MB & Allahganj NP of Jalalabad Tehsil.

Members of the Legislative Assembly

Election results

2022

2012 
16th Vidhan Sabha: 2012 Elections

See also 

 Shahjahanpur district
 Shahjahanpur Lok Sabha constituency
 Sixteenth Legislative Assembly of Uttar Pradesh
 Uttar Pradesh Legislative Assembly
 Vidhan Bhawan

References

External links 
 

Assembly constituencies of Uttar Pradesh
Shahjahanpur district
Constituencies established in 1951